The Umiida, also written Umida and Umede, were an Aboriginal Australian people of the Kimberley region of north Western Australia.

Language
The Umiida spoke one of the dialects of the (western) Worrorra language. What little is known of it, and Ungarrangu, was taken down by Howard Coate in the 1960s.

Country
Norman Tindale's estimate of their tribal domains assigns them , along the Yampi Sound coastline and its inlets, as far south as Cone Bay. In a northerly direction, they possessed the islands from Koolan to Macleay. Their westward extension went as far as Bathurst Island, Bayliss Island, and those in Strickland Bay. Their inland domains went only as far as the watershed.

Social organization and life
The Umiida were a nomadic rafter people who harvested the maritime resources off the many islands in their area, together with the Djaui and Unggarranggu, tribes with whom they had amicable relations.

Mythology
Like other Worrorra neighbouring peoples the Umiida belonged to Wandjina/Wunggurr cultural complex where the Dreaming imagined both wandjina, fresh-water creator beings who were custodians of key sites, and a common Worrorran rainbow serpent Wunggurr.

History of contact
A number of the Umiida were removed to Beagle Bay and died there. People of part Umiida descent are known to live in Broome.

Alternative names
 Umeda, Umidi
 Aobidai (Unggarranggu exonym)
 Umi:da
 Oken
 Okat
 Okwata
 Okata, Okada (an alternative Umiida autonym, used by the Unggarranggu for the language both shared)

References

Sources

Aboriginal peoples of Western Australia